Gorozhyonovo is a rural locality (a village) in Novoselskoye Rural Settlement, Kovrovsky District, Vladimir Oblast, Russia. The population was 14 as of 2010. There is 1 street.

Geography 
Gorozhyonovo is located 18 km south of Kovrov (the district's administrative centre) by road. Dobrograd is the nearest rural locality.

References 

Rural localities in Kovrovsky District